Joseph B. Kirsner (September 21, 1909 – July 7, 2012) was an American gastroenterologist and Louis Block Distinguished Service Professor of medicine at the University of Chicago. He was a pioneer in the field of digestive system disorders and was the first person to show the increased risk of colon cancer in patients with ulcerative colitis.

Early life
Kirsner was born on September 21, 1909 in a Jewish family. He was the eldest of five children. In 1933, Kirsner moved to Chicago after graduating from the Tufts University School of Medicine. Kirsner married Minnie Schneider, whom he met at Woodlawn Hospital on Chicago's South Side. While at University of Chicago, he published 750 papers and wrote six editions of a textbook on inflammatory bowel disease. In 1935, he joined the University of Chicago faculty and continued to see patients till the age of 100.

He had been instrumental in founding the American Gastroenterological Association, the American Society for Gastrointestinal Endoscopy and the American Association for the Study of Liver Diseases.

Awards and recognition
Over the course of his career, he was awarded twice with a lifetime achievement award by the Crohn's & Colitis Foundation of America. He also received the Distinguished Educator Award from the American Gastroenterological Association (AGA).

Publications
 Inflammatory Bowel Disease, Saunders, October 6, 1999, English, 
 Origins and Directions of Inflammatory Bowel Disease, Springer, 13 November 2013, English, 
 Pocket Handbook of Inflammatory Bowel Disease, Heinle, 21 January 2004, English, 
 Inflammatory Bowel Disease: A Guide for Patients and Their Families, Lippincott Williams and Wilkins, 1 February 1985, English, 
 The Development of American Gastroenterology, Lippincott Williams and Wilkins, 1 April 1990, English, 
 Crohn's Disease of the Gastrointestinal Tract, John Wiley & Sons Inc, 1 September 1980, English, 
 Diseases of the Colon, Rectum and Anal Canal, Lippincott Williams and Wilkins, 1 April 1988, English, 
 Growth of Gastroenterologic Knowledge During the 20th Century, Lea & Febiger,U.S., 1 April 1994, English, 
 The Early Days of American Gastroenterology, Lippincott Williams and Wilkins, 1 October 1998, English,

Death
In 2012, Kirsner died of kidney failure. He was 102 years old.

References

External links
 Joseph Barnett Kirsner

1909 births
2012 deaths
19th-century American people
19th century in Boston
American gastroenterologists
American centenarians
Men centenarians